Niklas Märkl (born 3 March 1999 in Queidersbach) is a German cyclist, who currently rides for UCI WorldTeam .

Major results

2016
 2nd  Road race, UCI Junior Road World Championships
 2nd Road race, National Junior Road Championships
2017
 1st Trofeo Emilio Paganessi
 1st Trofeo comune di Vertova
 Course de la Paix Juniors
1st Points classification
1st Stage 4
 2nd  Road race, European Junior Road Championships
 2nd Overall Trofeo Karlsberg
 4th Road race, UCI Junior Road World Championships
 4th Gent–Wevelgem Juniors
 8th Grand Prix Bob Jungels
2019
 1st Youngster Coast Challenge
 1st Prologue Istrian Spring Trophy
 4th Grand Prix Criquielion
 6th Umag Trophy
2020
 3rd Umag Trophy
 10th Poreč Trophy
2021
 5th Münsterland Giro
 10th Overall Okolo Slovenska

References

External links

1999 births
Living people
German male cyclists
People from Kaiserslautern (district)
Cyclists from Rhineland-Palatinate